Francis Brew (5 July 1903 – 13 January 1974) was an Australian cricketer. He played in 27 first-class matches for Queensland between 1924 and 1934, and in 1938 he became a member of the Queensland state selection committee. 

In Brisbane Grade Cricket Brew played for Western Suburbs from 1921 to 1941 captaining the club for several seasons. He was an all-rounder who bowled legspin, and in grade cricket he regularly opened the batting for Western Suburbs although he was not as successful with the bat in First-class cricket never scoring a century in his state career.

See also
 List of Queensland first-class cricketers

References

External links
 

1903 births
1974 deaths
Australian cricketers
Queensland cricketers
Cricketers from Brisbane